Don Telfer (born 19 May 1961) is a Canadian rower. He competed at the 1988 Summer Olympics and the 1992 Summer Olympics.

References

External links
 

1961 births
Living people
Canadian male rowers
Olympic rowers of Canada
Rowers at the 1988 Summer Olympics
Rowers at the 1992 Summer Olympics
Sportspeople from Calgary